Siddhartha Vanasthali Institute (S.V.I) is a secondary school located in Balaju, Kathmandu, Nepal. It was established in 2030 B.S. but has its roots in the Vanasthali Vidyashram established in 1951 B.S.

Scholarship 
A competitive examination is held among the top ten students of the final exam among nearly 250 students in each grade or level. The top three in the competitive exam are awarded with a Merit scholarship for one academic year. Scholarship is also awarded to those students whose work in any field of extra curricular activities  is internationally recognized.

Academic standards 
In SLC (School Leaving Certificate) examinations, it has achieved more than 60 national board toppers.

The number of graduates from Siddhartha Vanasthali School exceeds 6500. On average, this shows that 400 students get through the SLC from the school annually, indicating that the school has produced the highest number of graduated students in the nation.

Alumni 
Siddhartha Vanasthali Alumni Association is now popularly known as “SIVAA” (the short form of the association). The association was formally established in 1985 (2041 B.S) through the effort of 1977 SLC batch (2033 group).

Notable alumni
Sanduk Ruit
Temba Tsheri Sherpa
Jharana Bajracharya (actress and former Miss Nepal

External links
 

Schools in Kathmandu
Boarding schools in Nepal
Educational institutions established in 1973